Scarborough Centre Bus Terminal is a regional and intercity bus terminal in Scarborough City Centre in Toronto, Ontario, Canada, located near its namesake rapid transit station on Line 3 Scarborough of the Toronto subway. It is served by GO Transit buses, Megabus (Coach Canada), TOK, and other private coach services. The terminal is near the Scarborough Town Centre shopping mall and the Scarborough Civic Centre.

The original regional bus terminal opened in 1985 adjacent to the Line 3 station, but was relocated to a temporary on-street terminal on Borough Drive starting October 1, 2022. Line 3 is expected to close permanently in 2023 and be replaced with TTC buses until the Scarborough extension of Line 2 Bloor–Danforth opens for revenue service expected in 2030. The TTC required more space to handle replacement buses and required GO Transit and intercity buses to vacate the original terminal. A new Scarborough Centre Bus Terminal is expected to be completed in 2030 east of Scarborough Town Centre as part of a planned new Scarborough Centre station on the Scarborough extension of Line 2 Bloor–Danforth. The future bus terminal will also be the western terminal of the proposed Durham–Scarborough bus rapid transit corridor.

Operators

GO Transit

 Hwy 407 East GO Bus Service (route 51) between Hwy 407 Bus Terminal and Pickering GO Station via Centennial College and University of Toronto at Scarborough
 Oshawa/Yorkdale GO Bus Service (route 92) via Scarborough Centre Bus Terminal and York Mills Bus Terminal
 Durham College / UOIT GO Bus Service (route 93)
 Oshawa/Finch Express GO Bus Service (route 96) via Whitby GO Station, Ajax GO Station, and Sheppard–Yonge station

TOK Coachlines
 TOK Coachlines (formerly Can-ar Coach Service) provides service to Lindsay and Haliburton

Megabus
 Megabus service to Kingston, Montreal, and Ottawa

Terminal location

Original terminal (1985–2022)
Opened in 1985, the regional bus terminal was originally located adjacent to Scarborough Centre station on Line 3 Scarborough of the Toronto subway. With the expected closure of Line 3 in 2023 and its replacement by TTC buses until about 2030, the TTC needed the terminal space for its own buses. Thus, GO Transit and intercity buses had to vacate the original location so that the area could be reconfigured for more TTC buses. On October 1, 2022, the regional bus terminal was relocated to Borough Drive on the west side of Scarborough Town Centre.

Termporary terminal (2022–2030)
On October 1, 2022, a temporary on-street terminal opened replacing the original bus terminal. The temporary terminal has six bus bays located on the east side of Borough Drive between Progress Avenue and Triton Road. The terminal location is near the west side of Scarborough Town Centre shopping mall. TTC bus routes 21 Brimley and 43 Kennedy have stops within 50 to 250 metres from the temporary terminal. This temporary terminal will be replaced by a future terminal expected to open in 2030.

Future terminal (from 2030)
A new Scarborough Centre Bus Terminal is expected to open in 2030 east of Scarborough Town Centre as part of the planned new Scarborough Centre station on the Scarborough extension of Line 2. It will be adjacent to a new Scarborough Centre station, which will be located on the east side of McCowan Road, north of the Line 3 right-of-way next to the site of McCowan station. The new bus terminal will also be the western terminal of the proposed Durham–Scarborough bus rapid transit corridor.

Nearby landmarks
Located in Scarborough's city centre, nearby landmarks include Scarborough Town Centre shopping mall, the Scarborough Civic Centre, Albert Campbell Square, the Canada Centre government offices, Consilium Place and the Scarborough YMCA.

See also
Union Station Bus Terminal
Toronto Coach Terminal

References

External links
GO Transit page Scarborough Centre bus terminal

Bus stations in Ontario
GO Transit bus terminals
Transport infrastructure completed in 1985
1985 establishments in Ontario
Transport in Scarborough, Toronto